Yevgeniy Zhilyayev (born 13 July 1973 in Almaty) is a Kazakhstani water polo player. At the 2012 Summer Olympics, he competed for the Kazakhstan men's national water polo team in the men's event, but he has won no Olympic honor. He is 6 ft 3 inches tall.

References

External links
 
 
 

1973 births
Living people
Sportspeople from Almaty
Kazakhstani male water polo players
Olympic water polo players of Kazakhstan
Water polo players at the 2000 Summer Olympics
Water polo players at the 2004 Summer Olympics
Water polo players at the 2012 Summer Olympics
Asian Games medalists in water polo
Asian Games gold medalists for Kazakhstan
Water polo players at the 1994 Asian Games
Water polo players at the 1998 Asian Games
Water polo players at the 2002 Asian Games
Water polo players at the 2010 Asian Games
Medalists at the 1994 Asian Games
Medalists at the 1998 Asian Games
Medalists at the 2002 Asian Games
Medalists at the 2010 Asian Games
Kazakhstani people of Russian descent
20th-century Kazakhstani people
21st-century Kazakhstani people